Chewidden Thursday (also known as White Thursday, Chewidden Day or Jew-whidn) was a festival celebrated by the tin miners of West Cornwall on the last clear Thursday before (i.e. at least one week before) Christmas. The festival celebrated the discovery of 'white tin' or smelted tin by St Chiwidden, a little-known Cornish saint who in legend was an associate of St Piran.

Robert Hunt in Popular Romances of the West of England states:

See also

Picrous Day
Tom Bawcock's Eve
St Piran's Day

References

Cornish culture
December observances
Festivals in Cornwall
Christmas-linked holidays
Cornish festivals
Christian festivals and holy days